João Cabral was a Portuguese Jesuit missionary, who, along with Estêvão Cacella, were the first Europeans to enter Bhutan in 1627. The following year he became the first European to visit neighboring Nepal and the Sikkim region of India.

Cabral was born in Celorico da Beira, Portugal, in 1599. In 1615 he joined the Society of Jesus, and on September 5, 1626 he left for the Tibetan planes in the hopes of finding the mythic Kingdom of Shambala and spreading the Christian faith. After pushing through with both his plans, he returned to India and continued his missionary career in Malaka, Macau and Japan.

References

1599 births
People from Celorico da Beira
Year of death unknown
Portuguese explorers
Explorers of the Himalayas
Explorers of Central Asia
Roman Catholic missionaries in Bhutan
17th-century Portuguese Jesuits
1620s in Bhutan
17th-century explorers
Portuguese Roman Catholic missionaries
Roman Catholic missionaries in Nepal
Roman Catholic missionaries in India
Roman Catholic missionaries in China
Roman Catholic missionaries in Malaysia
Jesuit missionaries in India
Explorers of India
Explorers of Nepal